This is a list of writers from South Africa.

A

Lionel Abrahams (1928–2004)
Peter Abrahams (1919–2017)
Rehane Abrahams (born 1970)
Wilna Adriaanse (born 1958)
Tatamkulu Afrika (1920–2002), born in Egypt 
Lawrence Anthony (1950–2012)
Hennie Aucamp (1934–2014)
Diane Awerbuck (born 1974)

B
C. Johan Bakkes (born 1956)
Christiaan Bakkes (born 1965)
Margaret Bakkes (1931–2016)
Jillian Becker (born 1932)
Shabbir Banoobhai (born 1949)
Lady Anne Barnard (1750–1825)
Lesley Beake (born 1949)
Mark Behr (born 1963), South Africa/Tanzania 
Dricky Beukes (1918–1999)
Lauren Beukes (born 1976)
Steve Biko (1946–1977)
Troy Blacklaws (born 1965)
François Bloemhof (born 1962)
Elleke Boehmer (born 1961)
Stella Blakemore (1906–1991)
William Bolitho (1891–1930)
Diphete Bopape (born 1957)
Herman Charles Bosman (1905–1951)
Alba Bouwer (1920–2010)
Johanna Brandt (1876–1964)
Breyten Breytenbach (born 1939)
André Brink (1935–2015)
Babette Brown (1931–2019)
Dennis Brutus (1924–2009)
Guy Butler (1918–2001)

C–D

Roy Campbell (1901–1957)
Cecile Cilliers (1933–2018)
Stuart Cloete (1897–1976)
J. M. Coetzee (born 1940), awarded 2003 Nobel Prize in Literature 
Bryce Courtenay (1933–2012)
Jeremy Cronin (born 1949)
Patrick Cullinan (1932–2011)
Achmat Dangor (1948–2020)
Ingrid de Kok (born 1951)
Phillippa Yaa de Villiers (born 1966)
Rolfes Robert Reginald Dhlomo (1901–1971)
Finuala Dowling (born 1962)
Zebulon Dread (living)
K. Sello Duiker (1974–2005)

E–G

Tony Eprile (born 1955), lives in the United States
Ahmed Essop (1931–2019), born in India, grew up in Johannesburg
Elisabeth Eybers (1915–2007)
Mary Faulkner (1903–1973)
Ruth First (1925–1982)
Sir Percy FitzPatrick (1862–1931)
Charles J. Fourie (born 1965)
Lynn Freed (born 1945)
Dave Freer (born 1959)
Graeme Friedman
Stacey Fru (born 2007)
Athol Fugard (born 1932)
Sheila Fugard (born 1932, in England)
Damon Galgut (born 1963)
Nadine Gordimer (1923–2014), awarded 1991 Nobel Prize in Literature 
Khaya Gqibitole 
Stephen Gray (1941–2020)
Michael Cawood Green (born 1954)
Miriam Green (born c. 1950), living in England
Mafika Gwala (1946–2014)

H–J

Megan Hall (born 1972)
Joan Hambidge (born 1956)
Bessie Head (1937–1986), born in South Africa, mainly in Botswana
Cat Hellisen (born 1977)
Manu Herbstein (born 1936)
Christopher Hope (born 1944)
Emma Huismans (born 1947)
Robin Hyde (1906–1939), born in South Africa, living in New Zealand writer
Mhlobo Jadezweni (born 1954)
Cynthia Jele
Ingrid Jonker (1933–1965)
Archibald Campbell Jordan (1906–1968)
Elsa Joubert (1922–2020)
Gideon Joubert (1923–2010)
Amy Jephta (born 1987)

K–L

Harry Kalmer (1956–2019)
John Christoffel Kannemeyer (1939–2011)
Farida Karodia (born 1942)
Anne Kellas (born 1951), also connected with Australia 
Keorapetse Kgositsile (1938–2018)
Fred Khumalo (born 1966)
Robert Kirby (1936–2007)
Antjie Krog (born 1952)
Mazisi Kunene (1930–2006)
Richard Kunzmann (born 1976)
Ellen Kuzwayo (1914–2006)
Alex La Guma (1925–1985)
David Lambkin (born 1947), born in the United Kingdom
Anne Landsman (born 1959)
Mandla Langa (born 1950)
C.J. Langenhoven (1873–1932)
Greg Lazarus
Etienne Leroux (1922–1989)
Christine Barkhuizen le Roux (1959–2020)
Steve Linde (born 1960), newspaperman 
Douglas Livingstone (1932–1996), born in Malaysia
Anna M. Louw (1913–2003)

M

M.E.R. (1875–1975)
Rozena Maart (born 1962)
E. S. Madima
Tenda Madima
Sindiwe Magona (born 1943)
Arthur Maimane (1932–2005)
Angela Makholwa (born 1976)
Lucas Malan (1946–2010)
Rian Malan (born 1954)
Nelson Mandela (1918–2013)
Eugène Marais (1871–1936)
Mohale Mashigo (born 1983)
John Mateer (born 1971), also tied to Australia 
Mark Mathabane (born 1960)
Todd Matshikiza (1921–1968)
Don Mattera (1935–2022)
Dalene Matthee (1938–2005)
James McClure (1939–2006)
Michelle McGrane (born 1974), born in Zimbabwe 
Zakes Mda (born 1948)
Joan Metelerkamp (born 1956)
Deon Meyer (born 1958)
Thando Mgqolozana (born 1983)
Niq Mhlongo (born 1973)
Gcina Mhlophe (born 1959)
Kirsten Miller
Amitabh Mitra
Bloke Modisane (1924–1986)
Natalia Molebatsi
Casey Motsisi (1932–1977)
Phaswane Mpe (1970–2004)
Es'kia (Ezekiel) Mphahlele (1919–2008)
Samuel E. K. Mqhayi (1875–1945)
Lidudumalingani Mqombothi
Oswald Mtshali (born 1940)
Ena Murray (1936–2015)
Vusamazulu Credo Mutwa (1921–2020)

N–R

Njabulo Ndebele (born 1948)
Lauretta Ngcobo (1931–2015)
Christopher Robert Nicholson (born 1945)
Lisa de Nikolits
Lewis Nkosi (1936–2010)
Arthur Nortje (1942–1970)
Sibusiso Nyembezi (1919–2000)
Joy Packer (1905–1977)
Raj Patel (born 1972)
Alan Paton (1903–1988)
Phumlani Pikoli (1988–2021)
Sol T. Plaatje (1876–1932)
Christine Qunta (born 1952)
Jan Rabie (1920–2001)
Mary Renault (1905–1983) (immigrated to South Africa 1948)
Richard Rive (1931–1989)
Dan Roodt (born 1957)
Daphne Rooke (1914–2009)
Henrietta Rose-Innes (born 1971)
Eric Rosenthal (1905–1983)

S

Riana Scheepers (born 1957)
Karel Schoeman (1939–2017)
Alan Scholefield (1931–2017)
Patricia Schonstein (born 1952)
Olive Schreiner (1855–1920)
Sipho Sepamla (1932–2007)
Mongane Wally Serote (born 1944)
Ishtiyaq Shukri (born 1968)
Gillian Slovo (born 1952)
Adam Small (1936–2016)
Russell Smith (born 1963), raised and living in Canada 
Wilbur Smith (1932–2021)
Jason Staggie (born 1984)
Michael Stanley (Pen name of Michael Sears and Stanley Trollip)
Willem Steenkamp
Sylvester Stein (1920–2015)
Jonny Steinberg (born 1970)
Cynthia Stockley (1873–1936)
Harold Strachan (1925–2020)
Barry Streek (1948–2006)
Stefan Swanepoel (born 1958), now living in the United States

T–V

Can Themba (1924–1969)
Miriam Tlali (1933–2017)
J. R. R. Tolkien (1892–1973), Orange Free State/England
John van de Ruit (born 1975)
Sir Laurens van der Post (1906–1996)
Etienne van Heerden (born 1956)
John van Melle (1887–1953), born in the Netherlands 
Marlene van Niekerk (born 1954)
Charles van Onselen
Christopher van Wyk (1957–2014)
F.A. Venter (1916–1997)
Nicolaas Vergunst (born 1958)
Benedict Vilakazi (1906–1947)
Lettie Viljoen (born 1948)
A.G. Visser (1878–1929)
Wayne Visser (born 1970)
Ivan Vladislavic (born 1957)
Gert Vlok Nel (born 1963)
Eugène Terre'Blanche (1941–2010)

W–Z

Alf Wannenburgh (1936–2010)
Zukiswa Wanner (born 1976)
Lyall Watson (1939–2008)
Mary Watson (born 1975)
Stephen Watson (1955–2011)
Zoe Wicomb (born 1948)
Mark Winkler (born 1966)
David Yudelman
Rachel Zadok (born 1972), now based in London
Rose Zwi (1928–2018), born in Mexico

See also
List of African writers by country
Amstel Playwright of the Year Award
South African literature
South African poetry
List of poets
List of South African poets

References

South African

Writers